Kenneth D. Hill (6 August 1948 – 4 August 2010) was an Australian botanist, notable for his work on eucalypts, the systematics, evolution and conservation of the genus Cycas, as well as on botanical informatics.

He was born in Armidale, New South Wales.  He worked with the National Herbarium of New South Wales from 1983 until retiring in 2004.  He was also a senior research scientist with the Royal Botanic Gardens, Sydney.

References

20th-century Australian botanists
Australian taxonomists
1948 births
2010 deaths
21st-century Australian botanists
Australian Botanical Liaison Officers